Lake Ainslie is the largest natural freshwater lake on Cape Breton. The Southwest Margaree River starts at the lake and empties into the Gulf of Saint Lawrence.

It was formed during the Pleistocene, about two million years ago, when glacial outwash blocked the drainage of the valley of Loch Ban. It is underlain primarily by sedimentary deposits of the Horton and Windsor Formations, dating back about 350 million years.

A number of bald eagles nest around the lake. The lake was named after George Robert Ainslie, the Lieutenant Governor of Cape Breton Island from 1816 to 1820, when Cape Breton became part of Nova Scotia.

References

Ainslie
Ainslie